William Land Park, frequently referred to as simply "Land Park" is a major city park in Sacramento, California. The park is located between Interstate 5 and State Route 160.

William Land was a pioneer who built the Western Hotel at the NE corner of 2nd and K St in 1875 (California Historical Landmark #601).   There is an elementary school named after him.  He is buried in a Greek temple mausoleum within East Lawn Memorial Park in Sacramento. William Land was a founder of the East Lawn Memorial.

There are several city attractions located within the park including:
The Sacramento Zoo 
Fairytale Town, a park which has play equipment designed to represent articles from various fairy tales and nursery rhymes (there is a small admission fee).
The William Land Golf Course 
Funderland, a small park with several carnival like rides primarily for very young children.

"Land Park" can also refer to the surrounding neighborhood. 
Vic's Ice Cream – landmark restaurant in the neighborhood.

William Land Park was mentioned in Sir Mix-A-Lot's 1992 rap song "A Rapper's Reputation".

Gallery

See also
Urban park

References

External links

Amusement parks in California
Geography of Sacramento, California
Municipal parks in California
Parks in Sacramento County, California
Tourist attractions in Sacramento, California